Barbie: Life in the Dreamhouse is a web series of computer-animated shorts produced by Arc Productions and Mattel. The series was released on YouTube and the official Barbie website from January 10, 2012 to November 27, 2015.

The series is currently available on Netflix, though Netflix streams the series only as specialized bundles of episodes instead of in the original chronological order. Nickelodeon aired two "continuity" specials on September 1, 2013. The series later spawned a continuation, titled Barbie: Dreamhouse Adventures, released from May 3, 2018 to April 12, 2020 on Netflix.

Setting 
The series is set in a fictional version of Malibu, California, where all of its inhabitants are dolls. The dolls behave like humans, though a number of the show's gags rely on their doll-like nature. The series centers on the life of Barbie, her friends, her siblings, her boyfriend Ken, and a number of pets. The series is stylized as a mock reality show featuring confessionals of the characters in between scenes. The show heavily relies on slapstick humor, and makes a lot of satirical and self-parody references to the Barbie doll line.

Characters 
 Barbara Millicent "Barbie" Roberts is the lead character of the show. She lives in a large pink mansion called the "Dreamhouse" along with her younger sisters Skipper, Stacie, Chelsea and their pets. Barbie is a fashion icon and has had over 135 careers and over and over again; though a celebrity in Malibu, she is friendly, humble and good-natured. Voiced by Kate Higgins.
 Kenneth "Ken" Carson is Barbie's long-time boyfriend. Ken strives to be the perfect boyfriend for Barbie and is always there when Barbie needs him. He is an inventor who makes high-end machines and gadgets for Barbie to use, though they usually end up malfunctioning. Voiced by Sean Hankinson.
 Skipper Roberts is Barbie's teenage sister who enjoys technology and DJing. Voiced by Paula Rhodes.
 Stacie Roberts is Barbie's tomboy tween sister who loves sports and organization. Voiced by Paula Bodin (born Rhodes).
 Chelsea Roberts is Barbie's youngest sister who is mostly interested in collecting and playing with stuffed animals (including her eye-catching favorite Unicorn Plushie of the Month or simply Plushie). Voiced by Laura Gerow.
 Teresa is Barbie's extremely chatty but ditzy best friend who lives near the Dreamhouse and often makes silly, half-witted remarks. Voiced by Katie Crown.
 Nikki: Barbie's principal Black American best friend who is also close friends with Teresa. She manages a fashion blog and loves taking pictures as a hobby. She is creative, smart, sassy, outspoken, and very protective of her friends. Voiced by Nakia Burrise.
 Raquelle is Barbie's frenemy and rival for Ken's affections. She lives a very posh lifestyle in an attempt to outshine Barbie. She is portrayed as vain and arrogant and is not above deceit to attain what she wants. She is also clumsy, and her plans to sabotage Barbie often backfire. Voiced by Haviland Stillwell.
 Ryan is Raquelle's twin brother and struggling musician. He is in love with Barbie and often writes songs about her to impress her. He is a frenemy of Ken and will often brawl with him to win Barbie's affections. Like his sister, Ryan is also very vain and is often seen carrying around large cardboard standups of himself. Voiced by Charlie Bowden.
 Midge Hadley is Barbie's childhood best friend from Barbie's hometown of Willows, Wisconsin. She and Barbie lost touch when Barbie's family moved to Malibu. Prior to her makeover, she appears in black-and-white dressed in vintage fashion and speaks in the 1960s slang. She is also quirky, smart, and is fond of arts and crafts (particularly macramé). She moves to Malibu and develops a crush on Ryan, who does likewise after her makeover. Voiced by Ashlyn Selich.
 Summer is Barbie's fun and energetic best friend who loves sports and games. She is competitive, and her hyperactive nature is sometimes too much to handle. Voiced by Tara Sands.
 Grace is Barbie's new best friend and a new resident in Malibu. She is very smart and interested in science. Voiced by Lillian Sofia.
 Closet is A robot who lives in and manages Barbie's closet. The robot speaks in monotone and has an evil side. Voiced by Todd Resnick.

Episode list

See also
 Barbie (media franchise)
 Barbie Dreamhouse Adventures
 Barbie Dreamtopia
 Barbie: It Takes Two

References

External links
 The show's official website (Archived)
 

Barbie television series
2012 web series debuts
2010s American animated television series
2010s Canadian animated television series
American animated web series
American children's animated comedy television series
American computer-animated television series
Canadian children's animated comedy television series
Canadian computer-animated television series
Sentient toys in fiction
Works based on Mattel toys
American children's web series
Canadian children's web series
Television series by Mattel Creations
Television shows set in California
Works set in Los Angeles